Said Belqola (August 30, 1956 – June 15, 2002) was a Moroccan Association football referee, best known for officiating the 1998 FIFA World Cup final between Brazil and France, being the first African referee to officiate a World Cup final.

Belqola's international career began when he was appointed to the international list in 1993, going on to referee the match between France and England at the Tournoi de France in 1997. He was also among the referees at the final tournaments of the Africa Cup of Nations in 1996 and 1998, officiating two matches at each of the two tournaments. At the 1998 FIFA World Cup finals, he also officiated two group matches (Germany vs. USA and Argentina vs. Croatia).

Belqola was born in Tiflet, Morocco and worked in Fez as a civil servant as a customs officer.

Belqola died on June 15, 2002 after a long battle against cancer. He was buried in Tiflet.

References

 Said Belqola

1956 births
2002 deaths
Moroccan football referees
FIFA World Cup Final match officials
1998 FIFA World Cup referees
People from Tiflet